Paul Kiernan (born 25 March 1974) is an Irish bobsledder. He competed in the two man event at the 2002 Winter Olympics.

References

External links
 

1974 births
Living people
Irish male bobsledders
Olympic bobsledders of Ireland
Bobsledders at the 2002 Winter Olympics
Sportspeople from Dublin (city)